Yasna polyana is a village in Primorsko Municipality, in Burgas Province, in southeastern Bulgaria.

References

Villages in Burgas Province